Ryan Williams is a technology entrepreneur best known as the CEO and founder of Cadre, a New York-based technology company.  He was named to Fortune's "40 under 40" list for 2019, Forbes' "30 under 30" list for 2018, "Crain’s 40 under 40" list for 2017, is one of Commercial Observer’s "30 under 30" and has been profiled in Forbes, Ivy, technology and real estate trade publications.  In February 2019 he was on the cover of Forbes' "FinTech 50" issue.

In 2018 Williams announced a deal through which his company, Cadre, will receive at least $250 million (USD) in real estate investments from clients of Goldman Sachs. In 2020, Williams published a widely-linked op-ed in CNBC recounting his experience being supported by a Black-owned and Black-founded bank early in his career, and his commitment to increase diversity among participating banks and real estate operators in the future.

As one of few African American real estate technology founders and CEOs, he has often advocated for actionable change in his industry and society. Among other specific changes, he has advocated for increasing education about financial literacy as a key to closing America's racial wealth gap.

Early life

Williams was born in Baton Rouge, Louisiana, and founded a sports apparel company at 13. Williams matriculated to Harvard University, where he founded the Veritas Financial Group, the school’s largest undergraduate financial literacy group.

Career

Williams began his career in real estate technology during his undergraduate term at Harvard.  He was inspired to create a system to track foreclosed homes after seeing the impact of foreclosures during a trip to Atlanta.  By using data about properties and neighborhoods, he was able to start a business purchasing deeply undervalued homes and restoring them to occupancy.  This business "flipping" homes with classmates and others as investors was his first entrepreneurial venture. In 2020, he highlighted the importance of Citizens Trust Bank, an Atlanta bank founded by five Black businessmen and currently a Black-owned bank, to his early success. As a young Black man he was denied loans by 10 other banks before the then-chairman of Citizens Trust personally called to say that he believed in Williams.

After graduation from Harvard, he worked at Goldman Sachs and Blackstone before founding Cadre in 2014.  He worked at Blackstone in their real estate private equity division.

At 26 years old, he left Blackstone to found Cadre, a financial technology platform that seeks to make the real estate market more like a stock market. Williams currently serves as CEO of Cadre and has led it through a $65 million Series C fundraising round led by Andreessen Horowitz.  He has been quoted as saying “Cadre’s mission is to create a more efficient economy, where we can connect the world’s buyers and sellers in opaque assets that have been inaccessible to many.”  He believes that increasing the ability of investors to participate in alternative asset classes (such as "energy, natural resources, oil, infrastructure or anything that’s historically been privately held or inaccessible") will expand the opportunity to build multi-generational wealth to many more members of the world by "giving people direct, deal-by-deal access to commercial real estate, like you would buy and sell something on Amazon." To him, that mission includes a secondary market and the ability of investors to select the deals they are most interested in, at lower cost. The Economist compared Williams' Cadre to other tools that will "make markets for all kinds of assets as liquid as the stockmarket."

He is a regular speaker at conferences and in news programs regarding real estate technology.

In 2020, he published a plan to help increase economic opportunity for diverse communities through "formal mentorship programs to provide hands-on guidance, and ... comprehensive skills-training programs that help people of all ages get a start in careers that will allow them to succeed in a fast-changing economy."  He was interviewed by CNBC's SquawkBox, Forbes, and others in response to his call for proactive steps to increase economic equality.  Later in 2020, he reiterated the importance of remedying racial wealth and power disparities in the United States, noting for example that only 21 of over 4,700 banks in the United States are Black-owned or Black-led. He further committed to partner with diverse operating partners and lenders, as well as committing at least 10% of Cadre's cash holdings to be held in minority depository institutions to empower them to lend into underserved communities.

In 2021, Williams further announced a $400 million fund investing in commercial real estate and backing minority operators and partners to help produce greater economic equity. Williams later announced that his alma mater, Harvard University, invested in both Cadre and in the $400 million fund intended to drive diversity through democratization.

In late 2021, Williams publicly announced that Cadre sold three buildings for a total of approximately $312 million, providing $95 million in returned capital to investors and an internal rate of return of approximately 17%. Williams described one of the sales as the largest-ever digital real-estate transaction (i.e., a property bought, sold, and managed using a digital platform).

Personal life

Williams is a fan of LSU football.  He lives in Greenwich Village.  He has discussed his mission as an entrepreneur of color in a field that suffers "an outsized lack of diversity" and says "I've never let anyone outwork me."  In a 2019 CNN interview, he stated his goal to be judged on his performance alone: "at the end of the day, it's about results and what you're able to deliver, not about the color of your skin."

In 2020, he revealed that his great-great-grandmother, Addie Lynch, was born on a plantation in the late 1800s to a mother who had been a slave.  He described it as part of his personal heritage that informed his decision to mark Juneteenth as a holiday within Cadre to help the company and country grow from past inequities, and build a more perfect society and union.

References

External links 
 Quora Q&A session with Williams
 Forbes profile

African-American company founders
American company founders
Living people
Harvard University alumni
1988 births
21st-century African-American people
20th-century African-American people